The economy of the Falkland Islands, which first involved sealing, whaling and provisioning ships, became heavily dependent on sheep farming from the 1870s to 1980. It then diversified and now has income from tourism, commercial fishing, and servicing the fishing industry as well as agriculture. The Falkland Islands use the Falkland pound, which is backed by the British pound.

Historical development

During the 19th century, the supply and maintenance depot for ships at Stanley developed into a port serving ships rounding Cape Horn. There was also trade in cow hides from the wild descendants of cattle introduced by French settlers in the late 18th century. Sheep farming was then introduced, taking over from the cattle trade in the 1870s and becoming self-supporting by 1885. The islands also provided a base for whaling and sealing, with factories being built on East Falkland and South Georgia Island, but these industries ended.

By the Falklands War of 1982 sheep farming was the islands' only industry and their economic viability was in doubt, but after the war there was a new commitment from the Government of the United Kingdom. The Falkland Islands Development Corporation was formed in mid 1984 and in its annual report at the end of that year it set out to increase employment opportunities by encouraging diversification, to increase population levels through selective immigration, to aim for long-term self-sufficiency and to improve community facilities. To achieve this, the Corporation identified agricultural improvements, tourism, self-sufficiency in energy, development of the industrial and service sector, fisheries, and land subdivision as areas to tackle.

The largest company in the islands used to be the Falkland Islands Company (FIC), a publicly quoted company on the London Stock Exchange. The company was responsible for the majority of the economic activity on the islands, though its farms were sold in 1991 to the Falkland Islands Government. The company now operates several retail outlets in Stanley and is involved in port services and shipping operations.

By 2002 the Falklands' economy was booming, with income from tourism and the sale of squid fishing licences as well as from indigenous fishing companies with locally registered boats. Fishing boats visit the islands from Spain, Korea, Taiwan and Japan, and obtain supplies and services from the islands. An islander told the BBC that "we were the luckiest people that was ever mixed up in a war", and British diplomats joked that the Falklands should have a monument to Leopoldo Galtieri, the Argentinean dictator who invaded the islands. In 2007, Argentina withdrew from a 1995 agreement that set terms for exploitation of offshore resources. Desire Petroleum and Rockhopper Exploration began drilling for oil in the vicinity of the Falklands in the first half of 2010, sparking strong protest from the Argentine government. Diplomatic disputes with Argentina disrupted tourism slightly in 2004. Buenos Aires refused permission for charter flights from Chile that served cruise ships to fly over Argentina to reach the islands.

Economic overview

The Falkland Islands have a GDP of $164.5 million, and a per capita GDP of $70,800 (2015 estimate) compared with the United Kingdom GDP per capita of $35,200 (2009 estimate). The contributors to the GDP by sector (2010 forecast) are:

Fisheries – 52.5%
Government (including health and education) – 14.0%
Communications, Finance and Business services – 11.4%
Hospitality & Transport – 7.7%
Construction – 6.6%
Housing and other services – 3.2%
Mining. Quarrying & Manufacturing – 2.1%
Agriculture – 1.6%
Utilities – 0.9%
In the 2009/10 financial year, the government revenue was £42.4 million of which £14.5 million came from fishery licences and services and £10.5 million from taxes.   During the same period the government expenditure was £47.6 million.

Other economic indicators include:

Electricity – production:
19 million kWh (2016 est.)

Electricity – production by source: (2016 est.)
Fossil fuels: 74%
Non-hydro renewables: 26%

Electricity – consumption:
17.67 million kWh (2016 est.)

Installed nameplate capacity of electric generation

12,100 kW (2016 est.)

Banking 
The Falkland Islands do not have a central bank but the Standard Chartered Bank has a single branch in Stanley that offers retail, commercial and wholesale banking facilities.

The constitution requires the governor of the islands to seek the approval of a British Secretary of State before assenting to any bill that affects "the currency of the Falkland Islands or relating to the issue of banknotes" or any bill that establishes "any banking association or altering the constitution, rights or duties of any such association". These restrictions effectively give the British Government the ability to prevent the island's government from declaring the islands to be a tax haven or from establishing a central bank.

Agriculture
Farmland accounts for a little over 80% of the Falklands land area and a sheep appears on the islands' coat of arms, but agriculture is now less than 2% of the economy. , 670,000 sheep resided on the islands; a 2011 report estimated the sheep population at over one million.
Roughly 40%  of the national flock are on West Falkland and 60% on East Falkland. The base flock are Corriedale and Polwarth breeds with Dohne Merino, South African Meat Merinos, Afrinos and other breeds having been introduced to improve the fineness of wool and meat characteristics. The wool price suffered a slump in 2005/6 and a peak in 2008. Since 2003 the relative premium commanded by higher quality wool has increased with coarser wool missing out on the high prices in 2008. A summary of the prices for the period 2002 to 2010, which are often dictated by Australian exchange rate and weather conditions is shown below:

Although the production of wool is spread across the islands, the breeding of animals for slaughter is concentrated on East Falkland where the EU accredited Send Bay abattoir is situated. An additional cost borne by producers on West Falklands is the fare charged for crossing the Falklands Sound.  As of 2010, the ferry company making the crossing charged commercial vehicles £30 per metre for a single trip plus £2 per head of sheep. Wool on the other hand is charged "£45 per tonne delivered to Stanley".

An increasing number of farmers are supplying lamb to the Falkland Islands Meat Company. The abattoir received export accreditation in December 2002 and began exporting meat in May 2003. The number of farms supplying lambs increased from 6 in 2003 to 27 in 2007 while the number of lambs sent to the abattoir rose from 2600 to 11,963 in the same period.

Selected statistics for the year 2008/9 relating to sheep farming are given below:

There are also a small number of cows, pigs and horses on the islands that are reared for local use.

Fishing

Fishing is the largest part of the economy. Although Lord Shackleton's Report (1982) recommended the setting up of a  fisheries limit which gave an impetus to the fishing industry, the report did not go into much detail regarding the expansion of the industry. The Falkland Islands Development Corporation which formed as a result of the Shackleton Report provided the impetus for the Falkland Islands to exploit their marine environment.

Fishing grounds
The Falkland Islands' fishing waters form part of the 2.7 million square kilometre Patagonian Shelf large marine ecosystem and are located on a spur from the Patagonian Continental Shelf.

The principal ocean currents in the Falkland Island waters are the West Wind Drift, a cold current from the Southern Pacific Ocean that flows westwards to the south of the Burdwood Bank and the north flowing cold Falklands current, an offshoot of the West Wind Drift that curls around the east of Falklands Plateau and along the Falklands and Patagonian escarpments. It joins the saltier warm Brazil Current in the vicinity of the mouth of the Río de la Plata to form the South Atlantic Current.

In 1986 the Falklands opened up their fishing industry to outsiders with the declaration of a  radius Fisheries Conservation & Management Zone centered on the Falkland Sound.  This zone was later to become the Falklands Inner Conservation Zone (FICZ). Apart from the Falkland Trough, this zone lies within the continental shelf. In 1990 the Falklands Outer Conservation Zone (FOCZ) was declared – a zone that lay between the perimeter of the FICZ and the Falklands 200-nautical-mile economic zone boundary.  The FOCZ includes part of the Burdwood Bank, borders on the confines of the continental shelf and includes part of the Falklands Escarpment - a  undersea escarpment running east–west.

At the same time that the FOCZ was declared, the Argentine declared its 200-nautical-mile Exclusive Economic Zone (EEZ) and together with the British Government (acting on behalf of the Falkland Islands) set up the South Atlantic Fisheries Commission (SAFC) to coordinate the management of fishing stocks in the area.

Fish stocks

Most of the fish that are harvested in the Falkland Islands waters are either squid or finfish. Other types of fish form an insignificant part of the Falkland Islands' catch. A significant number of the fish that are taken are migratory with the spawning grounds and feeding grounds of some species being highly dependent on the water temperature.

Squid
Neither species was discovered in substantial numbers near the Falklands until the late 1980s.

The lllex squid has its spawning grounds at the mouth of the Río de la Plata and a migratory pattern that takes it southwards along the Patagonian Shelf as far as the FICZ to its feeding grounds.  It then returns to its spawning grounds via a route that lies off the continental shelf. In some years, such as 2007, it enters the FICZ with a resultant good harvest, it other years, such as 2009, it does not migrate as far south as the FICZ at all. The catch for the 2010 season in the Falklands recovered to 12105 tonnes, but still the fourth lowest since the beginning of the licensing system.  This has been attributed to the lower than usual sea temperatures during the feeding season in February–May.

The Patagonian squid, unlike the Illex, remain in Falkland Island waters all year and are concentrated in the Loloigo box—an area within the Falklands Plateau to the east and south-east of the islands and are harvested during both the austral spring and autumn.

Finfish
In the 1970s many fin fish, particularly the rock cod, a high volume low value fish were exploited to near-extinction.  The levels of rock cod taken in the whole of the South Atlantic dropped by 99.3% in the space of two years between the 1969–70 and 1971–72 seasons. while the patagonian rockcod was fished to near-extinction in the Shag Rock area. This resulted in a ban on fishing which was lifted in 2005.  Following the collapse of the Illex industry in 2008/9, the rock cod has become, by weight, the most heavily harvested species in the area.

In 2006, a Spanish vessel on an exploratory trawl found commercial quantities of grenadiers (Macrourus spp., Coelorhynchus spp.) to the south and east of the Falkland Islands at depths between  depths in the eastern part of FICZ. It has been estimated that this species needs a stock biomass of 40000 tonnes to produce a sustainable harvest of 3000 tonnes per annum and is now reflected as a separate entry in the tables below.

License quota policy and revenue
With the establishment of the FICZ, the Falklands Fisheries Department issued licences that enable foreign vessels to fish in Falklands waters. Initially there were seven classes of licence, but as of the 2009 season, this was increased to ten classes of licence. Each class of licence has its own characteristics – species or combination of species that may be taken, net sizes that may be used and seasons when the licence is valid. Initially licences were issued on a total allowable effort (TAE) but in 2007, the toothfish longline fishery became the first fishery in the Falkland Islands to be issued on a total allowable catch (TAC) basis.
Apart from the Islander's own fleet, the principal fishing fleets come from Spain, Korea and Taiwan.  When the Falkland Islands first opened up her waters, the Polish fishing fleet had a presence as did the Japanese, but the Poles stopped fishing in the area in the mid-1990s and the Japanese in the middle of the first decade of the twenty-first century. By 2002 the license revenue was so great that the island government had no debt and had built up more than £80 million in savings.

Since 1993, the principal licence classes have been:
A licence – Permits the taking of unrestricted fin fish during the first season
B licence – Permits the taking of Illex squid.
X licence – Permits the taking of Patagonian squid during the second season (Loligo).
Y licence – Permits the taking of unrestricted fin fish during the second season (The Southern blue whitting and the Hoki in particular are classed as restricted finship).

Revenue from licence fees (£ millions)

International cooperation
The Antarctic Treaty was signed by both the United Kingdom and Argentina in 1959.  In its wake, the Convention for the Conservation of Antarctic Marine Living Resources (CCAMLR), a treaty signed by 24 nations and covering the area that includes most of the Falkland Islands waters, came into force in 1982, having been signed by the United Kingdom on 31 August 1981 and Argentina on 28 May 1982. The convention covers Southern Ocean ecosystem which is generally accepted as being south of approximately 50° to 55°S. The CCAMLR provides a forum for exchanging information regarding marine life in the Antarctic region and has the authority to ban the harvesting of certain type of fish and also to ban or put restrictions on the use of certain methods of harvesting. The convention requires that member states who are not parties to the Antarctic Treaty accept certain provisions of that treaty.

The South Atlantic Fisheries Commission (SAFC) was set up in 1990 between the Argentine and the United Kingdom (acting on behalf of the Falkland Islands) to exchange information and to coordinate fishing activities in the South Atlantic.  One of their prime activities was the monitoring of the Illex spawning stock biomass (SSB). If the SSB drops below a threshold of 40000 tonnes the SAFC recommend will early closure of the fishing season. Since 2005 the SAFC has been largely moribund as the Argentine Government reduced co-operation, declining to continue the routine joint meeting process and suspending joint scientific activities. She has since extended her claim to all of the Falkland Island waters.

Catch statistics
The table below shows the average catch in tonnes of various species (as categorised by FIFD - Falkland Island Fishing Department) for successive five-year periods.

Tourism
Tourism is the second-largest part of the economy. In 1982, an average of only 500 tourists visited the Falklands per annum but by 2007, this figure had grown to 55,000 and the Falkland Islands Tourist Board hired its first tourism director that year. In 2010, the transport and hospitality sector was expected to contribute £7.8 million or 7.7% of the island's GDP. Tourism forms a significant part of this figure with land-based visitors expected to contribute £2.7 million to the Islands' economy in 2010. The islands have become a regular port of call for the growing market of cruise ships to Antarctica and elsewhere in the South Atlantic. Attractions include the scenery and wildlife conservation including 1,000,000 penguins, seabirds, seals, and sea lions, as well as visits to battlefields, golf, fishing and wreck diving. In addition to accommodation in Stanley, there are tourist lodges at Port Howard, Darwin, Pebble Island, Carcass Island, and Sea Lion Island. Self-catering accommodation at holiday cottages on island farms.  The total contribution of tourism to the Islands' is expected to reach £5.4 million in 2010.

During the 2008–2009 season almost 69,000 tourists visited the Falklands, with 62,600 of these arriving onboard cruise or expedition vessels. Since cruise liners have their own accommodation, substantial numbers of tourists can be accommodated at once, such as an occasion in 2005 when 3000 tourists visited the islands in one day. In 2013 passengers from cruise ships faced protests in Latin American ports over the British military presence. The cruise industry is expecting passenger numbers to decline from 39,500 in 2013–2014 to 34,000 for 2014–2015. However land tourism is increasing which is offsetting the effect of a decrease in cruise tourism.

Other sources of "tourist" revenue include spending by the British military personnel based on the islands, by business travellers and by pilgrims to the graves of both British and Argentine soldiers who fell in the 1982 Falklands War. Although there is still a resentment in the Islands to the Argentine occupation, the Falkland Islands Government continues "to respect the need for Argentine veterans of the 1982 conflict and their next of kin to visit the battlefield sites and the cemetery at Darwin".  Such visits are arranged in conjunction with LAN Airlines (Chile) who, on such occasions, use larger aircraft than normal for the weekly flights.

Energy and minerals

Petroleum exploration
Four sedimentary basins that could potentially contain hydrocarbons have been identified in the Falkland Island waters. They are:
North Falkland Basin which is located to the north of the islands.
Falklands Plateau Basin which is located to the east of the East Falkland.
South Falklands Basin which lies to the south-east of the islands and extends up to the Falklands Trough.
Malvinas Basin which lies to the south-west of West Falkland, between that island and Tierra del Fuego at the head of the Falklands Trough.  Part of this basin lies in Argentine waters.
The latter three basins are part of a larger contiguous formation.

However, in 2007 Argentina unilaterally withdrew from the agreement. In response, Falkland Oil & Gas has signed an agreement with BHP Billiton to investigate the potential exploitation of oil reserves. Climatic conditions of the southern seas mean that exploitation will be a difficult task, though economically viable, and the continuing Falkland Islands sovereignty dispute with Argentina is hampering progress.

Some 2012 exploration results have indicated that taxation on oil revenues, even though they will be amongst the lowest in the world, are expected to more than double the country's revenue.

North Falklands basin
In February 2010, exploratory drilling for oil was begun by Desire Petroleum, but the results from the first test well were disappointing. Two months later, on 6 May 2010, when Rockhopper Exploration announced that "it may have struck oil", Argentina's Foreign Minister warned that his country would take all possible lawful steps to impede British oil exploration and production there. In February 2011 Rockhopper Exploration commenced an appraisal programme of the Sea-Lion discovery. An update of the first appraisal drill was released on Monday 21 March 2011 indicating a significant reservoir package with a downhole mini Drill Stern Test flowing oil at better rates then the September 2010 flow test: confidence in the commerciality of the Sea Lion discovery has been increased by this first appraisal.

On 14 September 2011 Rockhopper Exploration announced plans are under way for oil production to commence in 2016, through the use of Floating production storage and offloading (FPSO) technology, replicating the methodology used on the Foinaven oilfield off the Shetland Islands. The proposal envisages a FPSO vessel located 200 km offshore servicing 24 production wells and 12 water injection wells in about 450 m of water. The wells will be arranged in clusters of 6 wells per drill centre. The two water injection well clusters will be 3.0 km from the four oil well clusters. Oil will be transferred from the FPSO vessel to shuttle oil tankers. Each year thereafter the production date has been pushed back another year.

The production site will require approximately 110 people working offshore and another 40 working onshore.

In May 2015 oil was discovered in Isobel deep in May 2015 by a consortium of oil companies including Falkland Oil & Gas, Premier Oil, and Rockhopper Oil & Gas.

East and south Falklands fields
As of 2011 the East and South Falklands Fields had not been fully evaluated; Leiv Eiriksson, a 5th generation semi-submersible drilling rig, is expected to drill two exploratory wells for Falkland oil and gas in 2012.

Renewable energy sources 

The island's government has plans to install a 2 MWh battery storage system which will allow surplus wind energy to be stored. The first three turbines resulted in a 20% reduction in the Stanley power station's fuel consumption and it was hoped that the second set of three turbines would double this figure. In parallel, there are on-going investigations into other forms of renewable energy for remote locations on the islands.

Transport in the Falkland Islands

The Falkland Islands currently has three primary means of transport - road, sea and air. There is now an international airport, a domestic airport, a number of airstrips, a growing road network and a much-improved ferry service between the two main islands.

Philately and numismatics

In October 1877, the Secretary of State of the Colonial Office, the Earl of Carnarvon began the process of application for the Falkland Islands to join the General Postal Union (renamed Universal Postal Union in 1879).  The first stamps, 1d, 6d, and 1 shilling values featuring the usual profile of Queen Victoria, were issued 19 June 1878. Since then the islands have issued their own stamps, which are a source of revenue from overseas collectors. Between 2000 and 2008, the islands issued between six and eight sets of commemorative stamps. The workload placed on the Falkland Islands Post Office by overseas collectors led to the establishments in 1978 of the Falkland Islands Philatelic Bureau. The Bureau also handles philately-related sales on behalf of the governments of Government of South Georgia and the South Sandwich Islands and of the British Antarctic Territory.

Coins and banknotes may only be issued by the Falkland Islands Government with the authorisation of the British Government.  Coins for local use were first struck in 1974 and are the same size as the corresponding British coins.  There is a flourishing business in the issue of commemorative coins struck on behalf of the Falkland Island Government for collectors – in particular the 2007 series of coins that commemorated the 25th anniversary of the liberation of islands attracted much attention. The Falkland Islands Government (FIG) is required to deposit 110% of the face value of any coins struck on its behalf into its currency fund, thereby effectively backing the Falkland pound with the pound sterling. In the case of commemorative coins that are unlikely to be redeemed, this money represents a long-term investment.  In many cases the set-up and production costs are carried by the mint concerned, who pay the FIG a royalty on coins that it sells to collectors.

See also

Falkland Islands Company

References

External links
Falkland Islands Development Corporation - Annual Report 1984
A Visitor's View of the Falkland Islands
Share the Falklands The Guardian
Four Seasons and more than 3,000 Tourists in One Day
"Falklands Experience" tours
Falklandsinfo: Welcome to our Spectacular Islands!
Britain sends minister to resolve Falklands air row with Argentina
Guardian Unlimited - Special Reports - The Falklands' rise to riches